Rafael Nadal defeated Andre Agassi in the final, 6–3, 4–6, 6–2 to win the men's singles tennis title at the 2005 Canadian Open.

Roger Federer was the reigning champion, but did not participate this year.

Seeds

Draw

Finals

Top half

Section 1

Section 2

Bottom half

Section 3

Section 4

Qualifying

Seeds

Qualifiers

Draw

First qualifier

Second qualifier

Third qualifier

Fourth qualifier

Fifth qualifier

Sixth qualifier

Seventh qualifier

Eighth qualifier

External links
Singles draw
Qualifying draw
ATP Rogers Cup - Montreal (CAN) 2005. Results

Masters - Singles